This is a list of election results for the electoral district of Whyalla in South Australian elections.

Members for Whyalla

Election results

Elections in the 1980s

Elections in the 1970s

 Preferences were not distributed.

Elections in the 1960s

Elections in the 1950s

References

South Australian state electoral results by district